Fabiola Zuluaga was the defending champion, but lost in second round to runner-up Tathiana Garbin.

Patricia Wartusch won the title by defeating Tathiana Garbin 4–6, 6–1, 6–4 in the final.

Seeds

Draws

Finals

Top half

Bottom half

References
 Official results archive (ITF)
 Official results archive (WTA)

Copa Colsanitas - Singles
2000 Singles